Berto Pisano (13 October 1928 – 29 January 2002) was an Italian composer, conductor, arranger and jazz musician.
 
Born in Cagliari, Sardinia, Pisano started his career as a contrabassist in the jazz groups Quartetto Astor and  Asternovas. He is best known as composer of pop songs, for, among others, Mina, and  a composer of musical scores for films and TV-series; his major hit was "A blue shadow", the theme song of the RAI TV-series Ho incontrato un'ombra, which ranked first at the Italian hit parade in 1974.

Selected filmography

References

External links 
 

 Berto Pisano at Discogs

1928 births
2002 deaths
Italian film score composers
Italian male film score composers
People from Cagliari
Italian male conductors (music)
Italian music arrangers
Italian jazz musicians
20th-century Italian conductors (music)
20th-century Italian male musicians
Male jazz musicians